Punctum is a genus of very small air-breathing land snails, terrestrial pulmonate gastropod mollusks or micromollusks in the subfamily Punctinae of the family Punctidae, the dot snails.

Distribution
This genus is found throughout the Holarctic ecozone, and also in South Africa and Mexico.

Species
The genus Punctum includes the following species:

The type species is Helix minutissima Lea, 1841
 
 Punctum abbadianum (Bourguignat, 1883)
 Punctum adami Bruggen & Goethem, 2001
 † Punctum alveus Pierce, 1992 
 Punctum amblygonum (Reinhardt, 1877)
 Punctum apertum Pilsbry & Y. Hirase, 1904
 Punctum atomus Pilsbry & Hirase, 1904
 Punctum azoricum De Winter, 1988
 Punctum blandianum Pilsbry, 1900
 Punctum boreale Pilsbry & Y. Hirase, 1905
 Punctum bristoli  (Gulick,1904)
 Punctum brucei (Jickeli, 1874)
 Punctum californicum Pilsbry, 1898
 Punctum camerunense de Winter, 2017
 Punctum depressum Odhner, 1922
 Punctum elachistum Pilsbry & Y. Hirase, 1904
 Punctum hainanensis (Möllendorff, 1887)
 Punctum hannai B. Roth, 1985
 Punctum horneri Ancey, 1904
 Punctum infans Pilsbry & Y. Hirase, 1904
 Punctum japonicum Pilsbry, 1900
 Punctum kilimanjaricum Verdcourt, 1978
 Punctum lepta (Westerlund, 1883)
 Punctum lozeki Horsák & Meng, 2018
 Punctum micropleuros (Paget, 1854)
 Punctum minutissimum I. Lea, 1841 - but Helix minutissima may be considered as a synonym of Punctum pygmaeum
 Punctum mokotoense Abdou & Bouchet, 2000
 Punctum morseanum Pilsbry, 1902
 Punctum nimbaense de Winter, 2017
 † Punctum oligocaenicum Zinndorf, 1901 
 Punctum orphana (Heude, 1882)
 Punctum pallidum Connolly, 1922
 † Punctum parvulum Gottschick, 1920 
 † Punctum parvulum A. B. Leonard, 1972 (unreplaced junior homonym; junior homonym of † Punctum parvulum Gottschick, 1920; no replacement name is available))
 † Punctum patagonicum Miquel & P. E. Rodriguez, 2016 
 Punctum petiti Fischer-Piette & Vukadinovic, 1971
 Punctum polynesicum Solem, 1983
 † Punctum propygmaeum Andreae, 1904 
 † Punctum pumilio Jooss, 1918 
 Punctum pygmaeum (Draparnaud, 1801) - type species
 Punctum randolphi Dall, 1895
 Punctum rota Pilsbry & Hirase, 1904
 Punctum seychellarum Gerlach, 1998
 Punctum smithi Morrison, 1935
 Punctum taiwanicum Pilsbry & Hirase, 1905
 Punctum ugandanum (E. A. Smith, 1903)
 Punctum ussuriense Likharev & Rammelmeyer, 1952
 Punctum vitreum H. B. Baker, 1930

Synonyms
 Punctum (Toltecia) Pilsbry, 1926: synonym of Paralaoma Iredale, 1913
 Punctum abyssinicum (Jickeli, 1874): synonym of Trachycystis abyssinica (Jickeli, 1874)
 Punctum clappi Pilsbry, 1898: synonym of Planogyra clappi (Pilsbry, 1898) (original combination)
 Punctum conicum Odhner, 1922: synonym of Sinployea conica (Odhner, 1922) (original combination)
 Punctum conspectum (Bland, 1865): synonym of Paralaoma servilis (Shuttleworth, 1852) (junior synonym)
 Punctum cryophilum (E. von Martens, 1865): synonym of Toltecia pusilla (Lowe, 1831): synonym of Paralaoma servilis (Shuttleworth, 1852)
 Punctum homalospira (Morelet, 1883): synonym of Psichion homalospira (Morelet, 1883) (superseded combination)
 Punctum hottentotum (Melvill & Ponsonby, 1891): synonym of Paralaoma hottentota (Melvill & Ponsonby, 1891) (superseded combination)
 Punctum lederi (O. Boettger, 1880): synonym of Paralaoma servilis (Shuttleworth, 1852) (invalid combination)
 † Punctum victoris (Michaud, 1862): synonym of † Lucilla victoris (Michaud, 1862)

References

 Fujie, A. (2000). Holocene Fossil Assemblages of Minute Land Molluscs from Sand Dunes on Kikaijima lsland in the Amami Archipelago, Japan. Venus (Journal of the Malacological Society of Japan). 59 (4): 317-324

External links
 AnimalBase info
 Morse, E. S. (1864). Observations on the terrestrial Pulmonifera of Maine, including a catalogue of all the species of terrestrial and fluviatile Mollusca known to inhabit the state. Journal of the Portland Society of Natural History. 1(1): 1-63, pls 1-10
 Pfeiffer, L. (1878-1881). Nomenclator heliceorum viventium. [Posthumous work edited by S. Clessin. Fischer: Cassel. 617 pp. See Bouchet & Rocroi, 2005 for section dates. pp. 1–64, 1878; 65–192, 1879; 193–400, 1879–80; 401–546, 1881; 547–617, 1881]

Gastropod genera
Punctidae